The great parrotbill (Conostoma aemodium) is a bird species the Paradoxornithidae family. Its genus, Conostoma, is monotypic. It is found in Bhutan, China, India, Myanmar, and Nepal.

References

Robson, C. (2007). Family Paradoxornithidae (Parrotbills) pp. 292–321 in; del Hoyo, J., Elliott, A. & Christie, D.A. eds. Handbook of the Birds of the World, Vol. 12. Picathartes to Tits and Chickadees. Lynx Edicions, Barcelona.

External links
 Great parrotbill video on the Internet Bird Collection

great parrotbill
great parrotbill
Birds of Nepal
Birds of Bhutan
Birds of Tibet
Birds of China
great parrotbill
Taxonomy articles created by Polbot